Bhatraju is an Indian (sub continent) caste of Telugu origin. Bhatrajus were originally a caste of Scholars, Soldiers, Ministers & Poets. Bhatraju caste claim to be one of the subcastes of the Kshatriyas. They are primarily found in the states of Andhra Pradesh and Telangana and also in smaller numbers in the neighbouring states. They are also known as Bhatturaju or Bhataraju or Bhatrajulu. While originally a caste of Ministers and Poets in the Kings' assembly, after the fall of indigenous kingdoms, they switched to Teaching & Poetry. They use Raju as their caste title. The Bhatrajus wear the sacred thread like the Brahmins and are well versed in sacred literature. They call themselves Rajus (Rajputs) claiming half-decent from ancient Kshatriya clans. Bhatrajus are classified under the other backward classes in most states of Southern India.

History 
Bhatraju population is concentrated in Rayalaseema region of Andhra Pradesh to where they were posited to have migrated from Northern Circars. Bhattu is an ancient race. The Bhattura Rājahs, descendants of Rajjalu, the son of Bhattara Harishcham, ruled the Ghurja kingdom. However, some of them became Kshatriyas due to their inclination towards Kshatriya Dharma, and others Brahmins due to their inclination towards Brahmanism. Like the Brahmins, they wear the Jandyam (sacred thread) on their shoulders and dominated traditional literature. The Bhatta tribe originated under the name 'Brahmarava Bhatta' during the Gupta period. Later the Bhatta caste - Brahma Bhatta, Maharaj, Bhatta, Bhatta Charya expanded into 5 branches. At present there are 5 important branches of the Bhatta caste with 89 sage tribes among the Bhattu kings. The Bhatta kings were a caste of Brahmin sub-castes. They also have Brahmin tribes, but their profession is that of chanting the exploits of former days in front of the troops while marshaling them for battle, and inciting them to emulate the glory of their ancestors."

In Madras Census Report, 1871, they were described as, "a wandering class, gaining a living by attaching themselves to the establishments of great men, or in chanting the folklore of the people." Madras Census Report, 1891, describes them as, "being a class of professional bards, spread all over the Telugu districts. They are well versed in folklore, and in the family histories and legends of the ancient Rājahs."

Notable people 

 Sathya Sai Baba
Dr. Shobha Raju
Asta-Diggaja of Vijayanagara Shri Rama Raja Bhushanadu
Nannayya Bhattaraka  (Bhakti Movement Poet).
Dindima Kavi's of Vijayanagara 
Rajanatha Dindima II
Rajanatha Dindima III
Dindima Bhattu

References 

Indian castes